Kiss Me You Fucking Moron is a 2013 Norwegian comedy film directed by Stian Kristiansen.

Cast 
 Eili Harboe as Tale
 Øyvind Larsen Runestad as Vegard
 Kristoffer Joner as Lars
 Rolf Kristian Larsen as Jakob
 Enja Henriksen as Emma

References

External links 

2013 comedy films
2013 films
Norwegian comedy films
2010s Norwegian-language films